This is about an article about a Japanese football player.
For the Japanese Brazilian model-actor residing in the Philippines, see Akihiro Sato (model).

 is a Japanese footballer who plays for Montedio Yamagata in the J2 League.

Club career

After four season with Kashima Antlers, he was released by the club in November 2015.

Career statistics
Updated to end of 2018 season.

References

External links

Profile at Roasso Kumamoto

1986 births
Living people
Association football people from Mie Prefecture
Japanese footballers
J1 League players
J2 League players
Sanfrecce Hiroshima players
Ehime FC players
Kashima Antlers players
Roasso Kumamoto players
Montedio Yamagata players
Footballers at the 2006 Asian Games
Association football goalkeepers
Asian Games competitors for Japan